Hans Stuffer (born 11 April 1961) is a German former alpine skier.

He participated at two editions of the Alpine Ski World Championships.

World Cup results
Podium

References

External links
 

1961 births
Living people
German male alpine skiers
Sportspeople from Upper Bavaria
People from Rosenheim (district)
20th-century German people